The Women's Professional Billiards Championship was an English billiards tournament held from 1930 to 1950. The tournament was first organised by Burroughes and Watts in 1930 and 1931, before the WBA ran the event until its conclusion in 1950. Joyce Gardner won the tournament on seven of the fourteen times that it was held, and was runner-up six times; the only time that she was not in the final was the 1940 tournament. The other players to hold the title were Thelma Carpenter who won four times, and Ruth Harrison who took three championship titles. Harrison's  of 197 in 1937 remains a women's record in competitive billiards.

The first six tournaments were held at Burroughes Hall in London. Apart from in 1939, when it was again at Burroughes Hall, all the subsequent editions were played at Thurston's Hall, which was closed due to bomb damage in 1940 and reopened in 1947 as Leicester Square Hall.

History

Although there were female players of cue sports since the games were invented, their progress in the game has been held back by sexism, with men typically not taking female players seriously, or claiming that the women were seeking male attention by playing.

In the mid-19th century, few women played cue sports, but they became more popular among wealthy women across Europe towards the end of the century. In 1905, John Roberts Jr. announced that he would be promoting a "Madame Strebor" as a professional; Strebor played Eva Collins in an English billiards series at Burroughes Hall in 1906. The Sporting Life commented that public matches between women were unusual enough that the series was likely to attract public interest, but that "many attempts have been made to popularise the game with ladies, with results anything but flattering".

Margaret Lennan beat Joyce Gardner 1,000–960 at Hull in August 1928 in a 1,000-up (first to 1,000 points) English billiards match that was billed as the Ladies' Championship of England and Scotland. Billiard  manufacturers Howard and Powell provided a silver rose bowl for the winner. In 1930, the cue sports company Burroughes and Watts organised a British Women's Billiards Championship, also known as the Burwat Cup. Another edition was held in 1931. In 1931, the Women's Billiards Association (WBA) was formed at a meeting chaired by Teresa Billington-Greig, with the aim of controlling the amateur and professional women's championships. It was agreed with the Billiards Association and Control Council that the WBA would take over the running of the competition as a world championship from 1932, with the same trophy that was used in 1930 and 1932.

Joyce Gardner was champion each year until 1934, when Ruth Harrison won the first of her three titles. The first century break in the competition, 100, by Gardner was compiled in 1934. Lennan made two centuries, 113 and then 153 in the 1936 competition. Ruth Harrison's  of 197 in 1937 remains a women's record in competitive billiards. Thelma Carpenter won her first title in 1940, before the championship was suspended during World War II. Carpenter was champion again when the tournament was next held in 1948, and retained the title in 1949. In 1950, she was watched by her 10-year-old son as she beat Joyce Gardner to win her fourth title. This was to be the last women's professional championship to be held. The World Women's Billiards Championship is viewed as a continuation of the amateur championship rather than of the Women's Professional Billiards Championship.

Tournaments
In some years the match winner was the first to reach a pre-determined points target, and in other years the winner was the player to score most points in a set playing time.

Finalist statistics

See also
Women's Billiards Association
World Women's Billiards Championship

Notes

References 

Recurring sporting events established in 1930
1930 establishments in England
Billiards
Competitions in English billiards
World championships in English billiards